State Route 25 (SR 25) is part of the system of numbered highways in Maine. SR 25 begins at the New Hampshire border near Porter, where it continues west as New Hampshire Route 25 (NH 25). Its eastern terminus is in downtown Portland at the intersection of Park Avenue and State Street. Administratively, it shares a terminus with SR 22 and SR 77.

Route description

SR 25 begins west of Porter, where NH 25 crosses the Maine-New Hampshire border.  The western part of the highway runs along the Ossipee River on the southern edge of town.  SR 25 intersects and overlaps with SR 160 before crossing the river, passing through the extreme northeast corner of Parsonsfield en route to Cornish, where it meets SR 5.  On the north side of town, SR 5 and SR 25 have a brief concurrency before meeting SR 117.  SR 5 splits off northeast, crossing the Saco River with SR 117 in tow, while SR 25 joins SR 117 south towards Limington.  After crossing the town line, SR 117 splits off with SR 25 continuing southeast through town.  The highway crosses SR 11 and then over the Saco River into Standish.  SR 25 meets the southern terminus of SR 113 and crosses SR 35 before crossing into Gorham.  SR 25 overlaps briefly with SR 112 before reaching the town center, where it runs concurrently with US 202 and SR 4, crossing SR 114 in the process.

SR 25 crosses into the city of Westbrook, where it uses Wayside Drive and the Westbrook Arterial to bypass the busy Main Street.  SR 25 Business, a former alignment of SR 25, serves this area.  The highway crosses into Portland and immediately interchanges with the Maine Turnpike (I-95) at exit 47, thereafter meeting its business route and proceeding into downtown on Brighton Avenue.  SR 25 crosses SR 9 (Stevens Avenue), then turns onto Deering Avenue, crossing over I-295/US 1 without an interchange.

The signed eastern terminus of SR 25 is at the end of Deering Avenue at Park Street (SR 22).  However, state route logs indicate SR 25 continuing along SR 22 to terminate at State Street (SR 77).  Both SR 22 and SR 25 officially terminate at SR 77, but SR 25 is not signed at the intersection.

History

Westbrook bypass

A bypass of Westbrook, in the form of William Clarke Drive, the Westbrook Arterial and Larrabee Road opened in the late 1970s, with the old alignment via Main Street being designated SR 25 Business. An unnumbered extension of Larrabee Road continues to the north with access to the Maine Turnpike at exit 48. In 2002, the Westbrook Arterial was extended to Rand Road in Portland, passing over the Turnpike with a new direct interchange, exit 47. By 2007, this bypass was designated as part of SR 25, with the vacated alignment along Main Street and Brighton Avenue becoming an easterly extension of SR 25 Business.

Eastern terminus in Portland
The administrative route log shows the eastern terminus of SR 25 to be at the intersection of Park Avenue and State Street (SR 77). However, signage in the field indicates this intersection to be the eastern terminus of SR 22 instead.  Current signage indicates SR 25 ending at SR 22 at the intersection of Deering Street and Park Avenue; historically, however, SR 25 has been defined to end at US 1, which used to carry a surface alignment in this area.  US 1 was moved onto I-295 in Portland in 2007, which has created a discrepancy between the "administrative" terminus and the signed terminus, since SR 25 no longer intersects with US 1.  The relocation of US 1 has also created similar discrepancies for the termini of SR 22 and SR 26.

Junction list

Business route

State Route 25 Business (SR 25 Bus.), internally designated State Route 25C, is a business route of SR 25, running  through downtown Westbrook and into Portland. It is a former routing of SR 25, which it connects to at both ends.

SR 25 Business begins at the intersection of William Clarke Drive (SR 25), Main Street, and New Gorham Road in Westbrook. The two routes run parallel to one another for about a mile, with SR 25 running on William Clarke Drive and SR 25 Business running on Main Street. The routes continue this way until reaching the Westbrook Arterial, which SR 25 turns onto to bypass the city to the south, towards the Maine Turnpike. SR 25 Business continues through Westbrook along Main Street, turning southeast to continue on Main Street in the middle of the city.

Larrabee Road, which used to carry SR 25, provides access to the Turnpike at exit 48. Until the Westbrook Arterial was extended to Rand Road in 2007 (and SR 25 moved onto the new alignment), this intersection was the eastern terminus of the business route. SR 25 Business was then extended by   into Portland, crossing over the Turnpike and becoming Brighton Avenue before rejoining SR 25, which approaches from the south to resume its original alignment through downtown Portland.

See also
New England Route 25

References

External links

025
Transportation in Cumberland County, Maine
Transportation in York County, Maine
Transportation in Oxford County, Maine